Martin "Marty" Pask (born 2 January 1985) is a former Australian rules footballer in the Australian Football League for the Brisbane Lions. After his AFL career finished he played in the Victorian Football League with the Werribee Tigers. 

Pask also played representative football; four times representing Queensland, twice representing Victoria (1 VAFA & 1 VFL) and once with the Allies state of origin side.

Pask is also a regular media performer with the ABC as a commentator during the AFL home and away season.

Sports agent

Pask is now an agent handling the careers of some bright young footballing prospects, including Michael Barlow (Fremantle), Brian Lake (Hawthorn), Nathan Vardy (West Coast), Dion Prestia (Richmond), Jason Winderlich (Essendon), Clay Smith (Western Bulldogs), Brandon Ellis (Richmond) and Dyson Heppell (Essendon).

Other athletes include Emily Seebohm who is an Olympic World Recorder holder in the 100m backstroke.

AFLQ career
Pask began his career at the Western Magpies and in 2004 won the National Australia Bank AFLQ Rising Star Award as well as finishing runner-up in the Western Magpies Best and Fairest.  Following this season Pask was selected by the Brisbane Lions in the National Draft.

Brisbane Lions
Pask was into his second year on the Lions' list before he was elevated to the Brisbane Lions Senior team in May 2006. Pask played eight senior games for the Lions before succumbing to injury which derailed his momentum. Pask then struggled to find pace and consistency after tearing his hamstring and reinjuring it several times.

Western Bulldogs
He was selected by the Western Bulldogs in September 2007 hoping to a change of environment would fix his injury concerns. Pask was released from his contract after playing a full season with the Bulldogs' affiliate the Werribee Tigers, without making his AFL debut for the Bulldogs.

VFL career
Pask played four seasons in the Victorian Football League with Werribee. His best season was 2007 when he finished third in their 2007 Best and Fairest award. That year Pask also polled well in the Liston Medal earning the most votes for the Tigers, finishing twelfth.

VAFA career
After Pask was released from the Western Bulldogs, Pask joined VAFA club University Blacks after rejecting offers from AFLQ, SANFL and VFL clubs.  Pask represented the VAFA Victorian side and finished with 44 goals in 10 games of football.

EDFL career

Pask retired from semi-professional football in 2010. Upon his decision to leave the Werribee Tigers he decided to sign with Keilor Football Club for the 2011 season.

References

External links

1985 births
Living people
Australian rules footballers from Queensland
Brisbane Lions players
Western Magpies Australian Football Club players
Werribee Football Club players
University Blacks Football Club players
Keilor Football Club players
Australian sports agents